Philepitta is a genus of bird in the family Philepittidae. Established by Isidore Geoffroy Saint-Hilaire in 1838, the genus contains the following species:

The genus name Philepitta is a combination of the French name philédon, for the friarbirds of the family Meliphagidae and pitta, for the birds of the genus "pitta".

Philepitta is now the type-genus of a new bird family, the Philepittidae, into which the Asites of Madagascar have been placed.

References

 
Bird genera
 
Taxa named by Isidore Geoffroy Saint-Hilaire
Taxonomy articles created by Polbot